Anthony David Moura-Komenan (born 20 January 1986) is an Ivorian former professional footballer who played as a midfielder.

Career
The-23-year-old, who came through the Bordeaux academy, is a free agent after leaving French club AC Ajaccio, who he joined in January 2009.

Trial at Huddersfield Town
Anthony was on trial with English League One side Huddersfield Town, and had been recommended to Lee Clark by former Newcastle teammate Antoine Sibierski.

He received a standing ovation on his debut when he was brought off in the 87min for the Huddersfield Town Reserves in their narrow defeat to Middlesbrough Reserves losing 1–0.

This is what Lee Clark said about him:

"Anthony has got a good pedigree as a youngster at the Bordeaux academy, but he hasn't been associated with a club this season," said Clark, who had the player recommended by (former Newcastle teammate) Antoine Sibierski.

"He's not played much football recently, but we've been impressed with what we've seen of him in training – he's got ability.

Rodez
On 4 January 2010, the 23-year old midfielder who was a free agent after terminating his contract with AC Ajaccio had signed an 18-month deal with Rodez FC.

International career
He represented his country Ivory Coast at the 2008 Olympic Games.

References

External links

1986 births
Living people
French footballers
Ivorian footballers
Ivorian expatriate footballers
FC Libourne players
French sportspeople of Ivorian descent
AC Ajaccio players
Ligue 2 players
Championnat National players
Footballers at the 2008 Summer Olympics
Olympic footballers of Ivory Coast
Rodez AF players
FC Rouen players
Anthony Moura-Komenan
Anthony Moura-Komenan
Expatriate footballers in Thailand
Ivorian expatriate sportspeople in Thailand
Association football midfielders
People from Bruges, Gironde
Sportspeople from Gironde
Footballers from Nouvelle-Aquitaine